Mask Singer is a Chinese reality singing show hosted by Li Hao in which celebrities perform songs for a panel of judges while wearing elaborate masks in order to conceal their identities. It premiered on 18 September 2016 on Jiangsu Television. It is based on the South Korean program King of Mask Singer.

Contestants 

 Mao Amin, singer Dajieda
 Bai Baihe, film actress
 Sha Baoliang, singer
 Zhang Bichen, member of Sunny Days, winner of The Voice of China
 Chen Bing
 Huang Bo, actor and singer
 Daniel Chan, singer, songwriter, actor
Angela Chang, singer and actress on My MVP Valentine
 Lin Chengyang
Julian Cheung, singer "Chilam" and actor on The Legend of the Condor Heroes and Cold Blood Warm Heart
 Jin Chi, contestant on The Voice of China
 Where Chou, singer
Joi Chua, pop singer
Tanya Chua, singer and songwriter 
Ding Dang, singer "Della"
 Ma Di, folk singer-songwriter
Sa Dingding, folk singer and songwriter 
 Jiang Dunhao, Sing! China winner
 Lui Fong, singer and actor
 Li Hao
Han Hong, singer and songwriter
Lala Hsu, One Million Star winner
Andy Hui, first runner-up in New Talent Singing Awards
 Li Jiage
 Man Jiang, singer-songwriter
 Kim Ji-mum 
Tan Jing, solo singer in the CPC Central Military Commission Political Department Song and Dance Troupe
 Hannah Kim, opera singer
Hacken Lee, "House of Cards" singer
Zhang Lei, The Voice of China contestant
Han Lei, folk and pop singer-songwriter
Sean Li, actor 
Yoga Lin, One Million Star winner
Shino Lin, singer and actress
Bian Liunian, musician, composer, and musical director
Justin Lo, singer-songwriter
Candy Lo, "Trash" and "Please Break Up" singer
Pang Long, singer
 Liu Meilin, Heroes of Remix contestant
 Ji Minjia, Super Girl contestant
Wu Mochou, runner-up on The Voice of China
Sun Nan, singer
Julia Peng, singer
 Shi Peng, singer
 Li Qi, The Voice of China contestant 
Huang Qishan, I Am A Singer contestant 
Yuan Quan, actress and singer
Li Ronghao, singer-songwriter
Zhou Shen, The Voice of China contestant 
William So, actor and Cantopop singer
 Lee Wei Song, singer
Wang Taili, member of Chopstick Brothers
Alex To, New Talent Singing Awards winner
 Wu Tong, performer with the Central Nationalities Song and Dance Troupe
Eric Tsang, host of Super Trio series
 Essay Wang, singer
Landy Wen, singer and actress
Shang Wenjie, Super Girl winner
 Man Wenjun, pop star
Victor Wong, singer
 Wowkie Xiangxiang
Li Xiaoyun, Super Girl runner-up
 Jian Xin, The Voice of China contestant
Xuan Xuan, actress
Han Xue, actress on Journey to the West and Cao Cao
Huang Yali, Super Girl contestant
Rainie Yang, singer and actress
Faith Yang, singer
Xiao Yang, member of Chopstick Brothers
Qu Ying, model
Yisa Yu, Super Girl contestant
 Wowkie Zhang, lead guitarist and vocalist of The Flowers
Jane Zhang, singer-songwriter known as the "Dolphin Princess" 
Guan Zhe, The Voice of China contestant
 Luo Zhongxu, singer
Bibi Zhou, Super Girl contestant

Show details

Week 1 (18 September)
The judging panel performed a medley of songs – Wang Nima performed "十年", Shen Nan performed "失恋阵线联盟", Ma Ke performed "口是心非", Dany Lee and Ivy performed "我好想你", Wowkie Zhang performed "葫芦娃", Ella Chen performed "后来", and Tao Ching-Ying performed "Can't Take My Eyes Off You" – at the start of the show.

Week 2 (25 September)

Week 3 (2 October)
Host Li Hao performed "男人不该让女人流泪" under the name 内心澎湃的水晶侠 at the start of the show.

Week 4 (9 October)

Week 5 (16 October)

Week 6 (23 October)
Guest judge and Sing! China coach Na Ying performed "离开我" under the name 吃瓜群众代表 at the start of the show.

Week 7 (30 October)

Week 8 (6 November)

Week 9 (13 November)

Week 10 (20 November)

Week 11: Finale (27 November)

Results summary
Colour key

Ratings

CSM52 ratings

References

Masked Singer
2016 Chinese television seasons